The Social Liberal Party was a centrist/centre-left social liberal political party in the Maldives.  The party was a splinter from the Maldivian Democratic Party, and faced a long battle to gain registration.  It was finally registered by the courts on 4 May 2008.

The party's leader is Nisaal.  Its deputy leader is Aiham.

On 8 May 2011, Ibrahim Ismail, candidate for Social Liberal Party in Maldivian presidential elections 2008 joined MDP together with other key members, Hassan Latheef, Fayyaz Ismail, Ahmed Abdullah Afeef, Hassan Ismail, Hussain Ismail.

The party was dissolved in 2013.

References

Social Liberal Party
Social liberal parties